The Aerican Empire, conventionally referred to in short form as Aerica, is a social organization that claims it is a micronation, founded in May 1987. Its name stems from the term "American Empire".  In 2000 The New York Times described its website as "one of the more imaginative" micronation sites.

Their flag is similar to the flag of Canada, with a yellow smiling face instead of the red maple leaf in the white square (although the red rectangles on the sides have different side length ratios). The national motto of the Aerican Empire is "The world is ridiculous; let’s keep it that way". It covers an area of 4,001 sq km, making it a bit larger than Rhode Island (3,140 sq km) and a bit smaller than Delaware (5,130 sq km).

History
The Aerican Empire was founded on May 8, 1987 by Canadian-born Eric Lis and a  group of his friends. For the first ten years the Empire was almost completely fictional, claiming sovereignty over a vast galaxy of feigned planets and engaging in wars against other micronations (although never resulting in physical contact). In 1997, the Empire created its own website.

In 2007, Aerica first issued "novelty passports." The first issued passport was exhibited in the Palais de Tokyo 2007 Micronational art exhibition. Aerica issued stamps for the first time in 2015.The Aerican Empire first issued coinage in November 2009, and a second coin was minted to celebrate Aerica's 25th anniversary in 2012.  Banknotes were issued for the first time in 2017.

Status 
The Empire's mission statement is: "The Empire exists to facilitate the evolution of a society wherein the Empire itself is no longer necessary." It claims to be organized as a parliamentary system, with various elected bodies and offices, under the oversight of an Emperor (currently the founder, Eric Lis).  Lis, who founded the Aerican Empire as a child, obtained his M.D., C.M. from McGill University and has been published in the Journal of Psychiatry and Neuroscience and Weird Tales magazine.

The group's activities are permeated by a great deal of humour and a love of science fiction and fantasy, with recurrent references to Star Wars, The Hitchhiker's Guide to the Galaxy, and similar works. Annually, the Empire holds story-writing contests, role-playing and wargaming days, and such events as the Dog-Biscuit Appreciation Day Scavenger Hunt.  It also developed a "religion" called Silinism, the worship of the Great Penguin; originally intended as a joke, but which the group claims to have thirty practitioners worldwide.  It has holidays and "niftydays" (such as Saint Bill’s Day, "honoring the ultimate nerd" and Topin Wagglegammon, "the Niftiest Day of the Year").

Offline activities 
Delegations from the Aerican Empire were in attendance at the Polinations academic conference in London in 2012 and the MicroCon micronations convention in Atlanta in 2017.

See also 
List of micronations

References

Notes

External links 
The Aerican Empire

Micronations in Canada
Micronations in Australia
States and territories established in 1987